Castilia is a genus of butterflies of the family Nymphalidae found from Mexico to South America.

Species
Listed alphabetically:
 Castilia angusta (Hewitson, 1868) – angusta crescent
 Castilia castilla (C. & R. Felder, 1862)
 Castilia chiapaensis (Beutelspacher, 1990) – Chiapas crescent
 Castilia chinantlensis (de la Maza, 1978) – Chinantlan crescent, pie-slice crescent
 Castilia eranites (Hewitson, 1857) – smudged crescent
 Castilia fulgora (Godman & Salvin, 1878)
 Castilia griseobasalis (Röber, 1913) – gray-based crescent
 Castilia guaya (Hall, 1929)
 Castilia myia (Hewitson, 1864) – Mayan crescent
 Castilia neria (Hewitson, 1869)
 Castilia ofella (Hewitson, 1864) – white-dotted crescent
 Castilia perilla (Hewitson, 1852)
 Castilia nortbrundii (Weeks, 1901)

References

External links
Images representing Castilia at Consortium for the Barcode of Life

Melitaeini
Nymphalidae of South America
Butterfly genera
Taxa named by Robert P. Higgins